The 1856 United States presidential election in Kentucky took place on November 4, 1856, as part of the 1856 United States presidential election. Voters chose 12 representatives, or electors to the Electoral College, who voted for president and vice president.

Kentucky voted for the Democratic candidate, James Buchanan, over American Party candidate Millard Fillmore. Buchanan won Kentucky by a margin of 5.08%.

Republican Party candidate John C. Frémont was not on the ballot in the state.

Results

References

Kentucky
1856
1856 Kentucky elections